Roni Sasaki is an American para-alpine skier. She represented the United States at the 1992 Winter Paralympics in alpine skiing. She was born with one leg and she competed in LW2-classification events (for athletes with a single leg amputation above the knee).

She won the gold medal in the Women's Super-G LW2 event and the bronze medals in the Women's Downhill LW2 and Women's Slalom LW2 events.

She also competed in the Women's Giant Slalom LW2 event but did not finish.

See also 
 List of Paralympic medalists in alpine skiing

References 

Living people
Year of birth missing (living people)
Place of birth missing (living people)
Paralympic alpine skiers of the United States
American female alpine skiers
Alpine skiers at the 1992 Winter Paralympics
Medalists at the 1992 Winter Paralympics
Paralympic gold medalists for the United States
Paralympic bronze medalists for the United States
Paralympic medalists in alpine skiing
21st-century American women